Des Moines Township is a township in Dallas County, Iowa, United States. As of the 2000 census, its population was 1,730.

Geography
According to the USGS, it contains three cemeteries: Robbins Chapel, Snider and Xenia.

The stream of Murphy Branch runs through this township.

References
 USGS Geographic Names Information System (GNIS)

External links
 US-Counties.com
 City-Data.com

Townships in Dallas County, Iowa
Townships in Iowa